Shoal Bay is a community on Fogo Island in the province of Newfoundland and Labrador. It is part of the municipality of Town of Fogo Island, with which it amalgamated on March 1, 2011.

References

Fogo Island, Newfoundland and Labrador